Frederick James Beeson (22 October 1901 – 3 August 1956) was an Australian rules footballer who played with Fitzroy in the Victorian Football League (VFL).

Beeson was recruited from the Benalla Football Club where he kicked 68 goals in the Ovens and Murray Football League in 1923.

Beeson kicked two goals on his VFL debut with Fitzroy against Carlton up until he was injured.

He later played for Coburg and Northcote.

Beeson was also an amateur boxer.

Notes

External links 

Fred Beeson photo  via Weekly Times newspaper

1901 births
1956 deaths
Australian rules footballers from Victoria (Australia)
Australian Rules footballers: place kick exponents
Fitzroy Football Club players
Benalla Football Club players